Elephant bridge may refer to:
 Elephant bridge, bridge whose construction depends on elephant labor
 Elephant Bridge, 1957 children's novel by Jeffrey Potter

See also 
 Elephant Bridge Hotel in Darlington, Victoria, Australia, known for its pub
 Elephants' Bridge, within Chester Zoo in England